Salt Is Leaving is a 1966 mystery novel by the British writer J.B. Priestley. Doctor Salt begins to investigate when one of his patients Noreen Wilks goes missing for three weeks. Despite a lack of interest from the police, he becomes convinced that she has in fact been murdered.

References

Bibliography
 Klein, Holger. J.B. Priestley's Fiction. Peter Lang, 2002.

1966 British novels
Novels by J. B. Priestley
British mystery novels
Pan Books books